The One Day of the Year is a 1958 Australian play by Alan Seymour about contested attitudes to Anzac Day.

Plot
Alf’s son Hughie and his girlfriend Jan plan to document Anzac Day for the university newspaper, focusing on the drinking on Anzac Day. For the first time in his life Hughie refuses to attend the dawn service with Alf. When he watches the march on television at home with his mother and Wacka, he is torn between outrage at the display and love for his father.

Characters
Alf Cook,
Dot Cook,
Hughie Cook,
Wacka Dawson and
Jan Castle.

Origins
The play was inspired by an article in the University of Sydney newspaper Honi Soit criticising Anzac Day and Seymour's own observations of how ex-servicemen behaved on that day. The character of Alf was based on Seymour's brother in law.

Productions
The play was rejected by the Adelaide Festival of Arts Board of Governors in 1960, but made its debut on 20 July 1960 as an amateur production by the Adelaide Theatre Group. Jean Marshall, the Director, and those involved in the Adelaide production received death threats. The first professional season was in April 1961 at the Palace Theatre in Sydney. It proved controversial and Seymour also received death threats however it was popular and there have been productions ever since. In 1961 Seymour travelled to London where the play was directed by Raymond Menmuir at the Theatre Royal Stratford East.

1962 Australian television version
The play was adapted for Australian TV in June 1962. It was directed by Rod Kinnear and adapted by John Sumner.

Cast
 Syd Conabere as Alf
 Stewart Weller as Wacka
 Dennis Miller as Hughie
 Elaine Cusack as Jan Castle
 Bunney Brooke as Dot Cook

Production
The production was produced by GTV-9 in Melbourne after a 16 week run of the show in which 28,000 people saw the show. It was estimated 300,000 would see the television production. Some of the language from the original play was cut.

It was the first of three plays of The General Motors Hour that year. The cast were all members of the Melbourne Union Theatre Repertory Company, which originally presented the play in Melbourne and toured three states.

Reception
The TV critic for the Sydney Morning Herald said the shortened adaptation "suffered much less than might have been expected in its transfer" to television, saying it "sometimes tended to focus more sharply the growing and bitter awareness of the increasing estrangement between an ill-educated, soured lift-driver and his university student son. On the other hand, some scenes of richly meaningful theatrical impact missed badly."

The TV critic for The Age said the "subject of this play overshadow the acting and the sets, giving the production a sleek look that it did not entirely merit."

Frank Roberts, reviewing the TV adaptation in The Bulletin in 1962, called the play "bloody awful".

Awards
The TV movie won Best Drama and Best Actor (for Syd Conabere) at the Logie Awards of 1963.

1962 British television version
The play was adapted for British TV in 1962 and produced by  James Ormerod.

Cast
 Kenneth Warren as Alf Cook
 Reg Lye as Wacka
 Madge Ryan as Dot Cook
 George Roubicek as Hughie Cook
 Georgina Ward as Jan Castle

Film adaptation
Film rights were bought by Lou Edelmen Productions in 1970 but no film resulted.

References

External links
 1960 play at Austlit
 1962 TV production at Austlit

Australian plays
Australian television plays
1960 plays
English-language plays